is a V-Cinema release that features a crossover of the Super Sentai and Metal Hero Series. The V-Cinema was released in Japanese theaters on June 30, 2018, and on DVD and Blu-ray on August 8, 2018.

The protagonists of Uchu Sentai Kyuranger and Space Sheriff Gavan: The Movie are featured, but the casts of Tokumei Sentai Go-Busters, Kaizoku Sentai Gokaiger, Samurai Sentai Shinkenger and Juken Sentai Gekiranger also participate in the film as well as characters from Sekai Ninja Sen Jiraiya.

A prologue web-exclusive series titled , featuring the casts from Ninpuu Sentai Hurricaneger, Tokusou Sentai Dekaranger and Mahou Sentai Magiranger was released on Toei Tokusatsu Fan Club on May 13, 2018.

Plot
Space Sheriff Shu Karasuma and Toma Amagi, the current Jiraya, members of Space Squad, locate and attempt to arrest Space Ninja Demost from the criminal organization Genmakuu, but he escapes through a portal to the Kyurangers' universe with Shaider chasing after him. There, the universe has been rebuilding since Don Armage's defeat four years ago under Tsurugi Ohtori's leadership while the Kyurangers have parted ways to live their lives, until Shou Ronpo discovers that Hammie stole four of the newly developed Neo Kyutamas. This causes a division within the Kyurangers, with those following Tsurugi seeking to arrest Hammie while Lucky and the rest want to find her and find out the reason behind her actions.

Hammie brings the Kyutamas to Demost, who uses them to revive past Sentai villains Mele, Juzo Fuwa, Basco Ta Jolokia, and Escape to serve under him. He then sends the five to attack the other Kyurangers in a hit-and-run, worsening Hammie's credibility as Shu and his fellow Space Sheriff Geki Jumonji offer their aid. It is revealed that Hammie is being extorted by Demost, who is holding her mentor hostage after she was assumed dead during Jark Matter's reign, the space ninja forcing Hammie to comply with his order to assassinate Tsurugi.

Hammie makes the attempt when Tsurugi makes a public announcement of stepping down in light of the recent events, only to hesitate as Geki and Shu reveal her forced compliance to Demost as he is exposed as one of Tsurugi's aides in disguise; Naga and Balance having rescued Hammie's master as added evidence. Demost attempts to kill Hammie when Mele, having feigned loyalty while becoming a friend to the fellow chameleon-themed warrior, sacrifices herself. The Kyurangers, Gavan, and Shaider defeat Demost with Juzo, Basco, and Escape returning to the afterlife after his spell is broken. Geki and Shu take Demost back to their universe and are informed by Jiraya about a massive terrorist attack led by Genmakuu. This makes Geki consider scouting some other new members for the Space Squad to deal with such incidents.

Cast
Super Sentai Series cast
: 
: 
: 
: 
: 
: 
: 
: 
: 
: 
: 
: 

Metal Hero Series cast
: 
: 

Movie-exclusive cast
: 
: 
: 
Announcer: 
: 

Voice cast
: 
: 
: 
: M・A・O
, Narrator: 
: 
:

Theme song

Lyrics: 
Composition: 
Arrangement:  (Project.R)
Artist: Kyuranger with Project.R (Takumi Kizu, Yosuke Kishi, Taiki Yamazaki, Sakurako Okubo, Tetsuji Sakakibara, Shota Taguchi, Keisuke Minami, Tomohiro Hatano, Tsuyoshi Matsubara)

References

External links
(In Japanese)

Toei tokusatsu films
2010s science fiction films
Metal Hero films
Crossover tokusatsu films
2018 films
2010s Japanese superhero films
Films based on classical mythology
2010s Super Sentai films